Ex nunc is a Latin phrase meaning from now on. It is used as a legal term to signify that something is valid only for the future and not the past. The opposite is ex tunc.

See also 
 List of legal Latin terms

Latin legal terminology